Troughton Island Airport  is located on Troughton Island, Western Australia.

See also
 List of airports in Western Australia
 Aviation transport in Australia

References

External links
 Airservices Aerodromes & Procedure Charts

Airports in Western Australia